Mercantonfjellet is a mountain area in Haakon VII Land at Spitsbergen, Svalbard. It has a length of about seven kilometres, and is located between Fjortende Julibreen and Blomstrandbreen. Among the peaks are Svansen and Sveitsartoppen. The area is named after Swiss glaciologist Paul Louis Mercanton.

References

Mountains of Spitsbergen